Maëva Coucke (born 28 June 1994) is a French model and beauty pageant titleholder who was crowned Miss France 2018. She represented France at Miss World 2018, where she placed in the top twelve, and also represented France at Miss Universe 2019, where she placed in the top ten. Coucke is the third Miss France winner from Nord-Pas-de-Calais within the span of four years, following Iris Mittenaere (2016) and Camille Cerf (2015).

Early life and education
Coucke was born in Fougères in Ille-et-Vilaine, and raised in Ferques in Pas-de-Calais. Her father is a gendarme, while her mother is a childcare assistant originally from Avesnes-sur-Helpe. She has an older sister, Victoria, and a twin sister, Alizée. Her parents divorced when she was 13, and she was then raised by her mother.

In 2011, Coucke participated in the Elite Model Look contest with her twin sister. She later received her baccalauréat with a focus in management in 2013. Then, Coucke received a BTS in international business in 2015. In 2017, Coucke was a first year law student and wanted to become an in-house counsel. After being elected Miss France 2018, she decided to pursue an acting career.

She is a natural blonde, but has been dyeing her hair red since 2016.

Pageantry

Miss France 2018
Coucke started her pageantry career in 2013, when she was crowned Miss Boulogne 2013. In October 2016, Coucke was crowned Miss Pévèle 2016 and therefore, was allowed to compete in the Miss Nord-Pas-de-Calais 2017 competition. On 23 September 2017, she was crowned Miss Nord-Pas-de-Calais 2017 in Orchies, then represented Nord-Pas-de-Calais at Miss France 2018. Coucke won the competition, and was crowned Miss France 2018. She is the third woman from Nord-Pas-de-Calais to win the title, following Miss France 2016 Iris Mittenaere and Miss France 2015 Camille Cerf.

Coucke began to raise awareness for breast cancer after her mother was diagnosed with the disease in 2012. As Miss France 2018, she promoted the development of breast cancer prevention and screening. She was involved in make-up and dance workshops in hospitals to help women undergoing cancer treatment feel more confident in themselves. On 1 October 2018, she launched the Breast Cancer Awareness Month at the Eiffel Tower which was lit up in rosy pink lights to support Breast cancer awareness.

Miss World 2018
Coucke represented France at Miss World 2018, where she placed in the top 12. At Miss World 2018, she won the Top Model fast track event, giving her direct access into the top thirty. She was also Top 5 in the Multimedia competition and won the first round of the Head to Head challenge.

Miss Universe 2019
After Vaimalama Chaves opted not to compete in an international pageant, the Miss France Organisation confirmed on 23 September 2019 that they had appointed Coucke to represent France at Miss Universe 2019.

During the preliminary competition, Coucke slipped and fell on stage, along with several other contestants who also fell in the same spot. The incident was widely reported in the Francophone media, but it did not prevent her to place in the top ten. She ultimately went on to advance as one of the top five contestants from Europe, ultimately finishing in the overall top ten.

References

External links

1994 births
French beauty pageant winners
French female models
Living people
Miss France winners
Miss World 2018 delegates
People from Boulogne-sur-Mer
People from Fougères
French twins
Miss Universe 2019 contestants